Dutchess Stadium is a baseball park in Wappingers Falls, New York. Opened in 1994, it holds 4,500 people. It is located on New York State Route 9D and is located across Interstate 84 from Fishkill Correctional Facility. Construction of the stadium began in January 1994 and it opened six months later in June 1994.

Uses

The stadium is primarily used for baseball, as the home field of the Hudson Valley Renegades minor league baseball team. 

In 2021, the team joined the High-A East as an affiliate of the New York Yankees. Formerly the Renegades were the short season-A level team of the Tampa Bay Rays in the now-defunct New York-Penn League.

Each April the stadium hosts the Hudson Valley Baseball Classic between Marist College and the United States Military Academy.  Besides baseball, it is also used for weddings, catered events, concerts, as well as high school and college graduations.  The stadium hosts K104's annual KFest concert held in early June, as well as a rock concert, usually held in late August. Performing artists have included Akon, Rihanna, Fat Joe, Counting Crows, Collective Soul, Wilco, Def Leppard, Bob Dylan, Drake and Adam Lambert, among others.

On July 15, 2014, it was announced that Manhattan College's baseball team would play all of their home competitions at Dutchess Stadium. The team played their final season at the venue in 2019 before returning to Van Cortlandt Park.

The stadium's first football tenant, the Hudson Valley Fort of the Fall Experimental Football League, took up residence in the stadium in October 2015. Some high school football playoff contests were also to be held at the stadium that year, but the stadium was later determined to be unsafe as a football venue and those games were canceled.

Features
In addition to concessions, the stadium features a kids area, which includes an ice cream shop and play areas. The entire field, excluding the pitchers mound and home plate area, was converted to AstroTurf in the spring of 2014.

References

External links

Hudson Valley Renegades: Dutchess Stadium
Balkpark Reviews review of Dutchess Stadium
Dutchess Stadium Views - Ball Parks of the Minor Leagues
Stadium Review and Photos of Dutchess Stadium
Dutchess Stadium and the Hudson Valley Renegades Review: A Wedding and a Ball Game

Sports venues in Dutchess County, New York
American football venues in New York (state)
Baseball venues in New York (state)
Minor league baseball venues
Manhattan Jaspers baseball
College baseball venues in the United States
Sports venues in the New York metropolitan area
Sports venues completed in 1994
1994 establishments in New York (state)
Fishkill, New York
Hudson Valley Fort
South Atlantic League ballparks